Bert och brorsorna  is a diary novel, written by Anders Jacobsson and Sören Olsson and originally published in 1995, it tells the story of Bert Ljung from 7 June to 23 August during the calendar year he turns 12 during the summer vacation between the 5th and 6th grade at school in Sweden.

Book cover
The book cover depicts Nadja's raggare brothers "Roffe", "Ragge" and Reinhold who drag out Bert to raggare activities in the summer evening. On the book title text is a bird.

Plot
Bert Ljung finishes the 5th grade, and Klimpen will move to Motala. When the 5th grade is over, the 6th grade students hold a penis measuring contest, won by Peter Kollegård in 6 C while the 5th graders are let in to cheer. Berts första betraktelser depicts the guys in Bert's school class holding a penis measuring in the 6th grade, and Bert describing last year's penis measuring contest between the 6th graders.

Nadja's raggare brothers force Bert to do a "raggare PRAO ", and shout to a group of unknown girls to show the breast, just as in the TV series.

Despite fearing her brothers, Bert continues meeting Nadja Nilsson.

Bert's family also goes on a trip to Denmark in July, and on board the boat they meet a family where a 6 years old child asks Bert how many political parties are in the parliament of Sweden.

In August Bert, Åke and Lill-Erik sleep in a tent in the giant woodlands behind the hil, and when the book is over Bert is about the start the 6th grade, and Klimpen will move to Motala.

References 

Bert och brorsorna, Rabén & Sjögren, 1995

1995 children's books
Novels set in Denmark
Interquel novels
Bert books
Rabén & Sjögren books
1995 Swedish novels